A tide is the rise and fall of a sea level caused by the Moon's gravity and other factors.

Tide may also refer to:

Media
 The Tide (Nigeria), a newspaper
Tide (TV series), 2019 Irish/Welsh/Scottish documentary series
 WTKN, a radio station licensed to Murrells inlet, South Carolina, United States and known as 94.5 the Tide from 2015 to 2019
Tides (film), a 2021 German-Swiss science fiction thriller film

Music
 Tide (album), a 1970 album by Antonio Carlos Jobim
 Tides (Arovane album), 2000
 Tides (Phaeleh album), 2013
 Tides (Bethel Music album), 2013
 "Tides", a song by Hawkwind from their 1988 album The Xenon Codex
 "Tides" (Suede song), a song by Suede on their 2018 album The Blue Hour
 "Tides", a song by The xx from their 2012 album Coexist
 "Tides", a song by KSI from his 2020 album Dissimulation
 "The Tide", a song by Neurosis from their 2001 album A Sun That Never Sets
 "Tides", a song by Ed Sheeran from his 2021 album =

Sports
 Alabama Crimson Tide, an American collegiate sports program
 Norfolk Tides, a minor league baseball team

Transport
 Tide (transportation company), a public transportation company in Norway
 Tide Light Rail, a light rail system in Norfolk, Virginia, US
 Tide-class tanker, supply ships for Britain's Royal Navy

Other uses
 Tide (financial service), a UK financial technology company
 Tide (brand), a laundry detergent made by Procter & Gamble
 Tide (Pillow Pal), a Pillow Pal whale made by Ty, Inc.
 Tide, Oregon, an unincorporated US community
 Tides Center, a non-profit organization in San Francisco, CA
 DARPA TIDES program, launched to stimulate research on multilingual information extraction technology
 Terrorist Identities Datamart Environment, a terrorist-screening database
 Hour, from its Old English name tīd
 Canonical hour, from the same word
 Liturgical season, from the same word, now usually only as a suffix
 The Institute for Diversity and Ethics in Sport

See also
 Tide dial, a sundial listing the canonical hours
 The Tide (disambiguation)
 Tidal (disambiguation)
 High tide (disambiguation)
 Ebb tide (disambiguation)